Gus Hoffman, born Augustus Paul Hoffman, is an actor. He is perhaps best known for his roles as Warren on The Suite Life of Zack & Cody, as Goggles in the movie Rebound and Johnny Nightingale on Lincoln Heights. from seasons 1-3

Career

Personal life
Gus grew up in Ojai, California.

Filmography

References

External links

Living people
1991 births
Male actors from Colorado
21st-century American male actors
American male film actors
African-American male actors
American male television actors
American male stage actors
American male child actors
21st-century African-American people